The Roman Catholic Diocese of Campanha is a diocese located in the city of Campanha in the Ecclesiastical province of Pouso Alegre in Brazil.

History
 8 September 1907: Established as Diocese of Campanha from the Diocese of São Paulo

Special churches
Minor Basilicas:
Basílica Nossa Senhora da Conceição, Conceição do Rio Verde, Minas Gerais
Basílica Nossa Senhora das Dores, Boa Esperança, Minas Gerais

Bishops
 Bishops of Campanha (Roman rite), in reverse chronological order
 Bishop Pedro Cunha Cruz (2015.11.25 - Present)
 Bishop Diamantino Prata de Carvalho, O.F.M. (1998.03.25 – 2015.11.25)
 Bishop Aloísio Roque Oppermann, S.C.J.  (1991.05.15 – 1996.02.28), appointed Archbishop of Uberaba, Minas Gerais 
 Bishop Aloísio Ariovaldo Amaral, C.Ss.R. (1984.04.14 – 1991.05.15)
 Bishop Othon Motta (1960.05.16 – 1982.01.16)
 Bishop Inocêncio Engelke, O.F.M. (1935.12.25 – 1960.06.16)
 Bishop João de Almeida Ferrão (1909.04.29 – 1935.12.25)

Coadjutor bishops
Inocêncio Engelke, O.F.M. (1924-1935)
Othon Motta (1959-1960)
Antônio Afonso de Miranda, S.D.N. (1977-1981), did not succeed to see; appointed Bishop of Taubaté, São Paulo
Aloísio Roque Oppermann, S.C.I. (1988-1991)
Pedro Cunha Cruz (2015)

Other priests of this diocese who became bishops
José Costa Campos, appointed Bishop of Valença, Rio de Janeiro in 1960
Tomé Ferreira da Silva, appointed Auxiliary Bishop of São Paulo in 2005

References

 GCatholic.org
 Catholic Hierarchy
 Diocese website (Portuguese)

Roman Catholic dioceses in Brazil
Christian organizations established in 1907
Campanha, Roman Catholic Diocese of
Roman Catholic dioceses and prelatures established in the 20th century
1907 establishments in Brazil